Joshua Woodrow Sill (December 6, 1831 – December 31, 1862) was a career officer in the United States Army and brigadier general during the American Civil War. He was killed at the Battle of Stones River in Tennessee. Fort Sill, Oklahoma, was later named in his honor.

Early life and background
Sill was born in Chillicothe, Ohio. His early education was obtained largely from his father, who was a lawyer. Sill was appointed in 1849 to the United States Military Academy. During his four years at West Point he ranked among the best scholars and graduated third in his class of 52 cadets. Upon graduation he was commissioned a brevet second lieutenant in Ordnance and his first assignment was at the Watervliet Arsenal in Troy, New York. In 1855 he was assigned to West Point as an instructor. After two years there he was assigned to Pittsburgh Arsenal as an ordnance officer.

In May 1858, Sill was sent to Vancouver in Washington Territory to superintend the building of an arsenal. Difficulties with the British Government prevented the construction of this arsenal and he was reassigned to Watervleit Arsenal. A few months later he was ordered to Fort Leavenworth, but resigned his commission in January 1861. He then taught mathematics and civil engineering in the Brooklyn Collegiate and Polytechnic Institute.

Civil War
Following the bombardment of Fort Sumter, Sill resigned his teaching position and offered his services to the Governor of Ohio, who appointed him Assistant Adjutant General of the State in May 1861. Here he was occupied in the organization of the Ohio forces. In August 1861 he was commissioned colonel of the 33rd Ohio Infantry and accompanied Brig. Gen. William "Bull" Nelson in the Eastern Kentucky expedition.

He was then assigned as a brigade commander in Brig. Gen. Ormsby M. Mitchel's division of the Army of the Ohio. He was promoted to the rank of brigadier general on July 16, 1862. Shortly thereafter, Sill was elevated to command of a division, though was soon reassigned to command a brigade in Maj. Gen. Philip Sheridan's division of the now-named Army of the Cumberland.

Sill took part in the bloodiest battle of the Civil War (in terms of percentage of casualties on both sides), the Battle of Stones River, just outside Murfreesboro, Tennessee. On the first day of battle, while leading his men forward, he was killed by rifle fire. On the eve of the battle, Sill had been in conference with his commander, General Sheridan. When the conference adjourned and the attendees began to disperse, Sill and Sheridan mistakenly put on each other's coats. Sill was thus wearing Sheridan's coat at the time he was killed.

Death
Sill's body was found by Confederate troops, who buried it in a battlefield cemetery near the scene of his death. Sill was later interred at Grandview Cemetery, Chillicothe, Ross County, Ohio.
 
An epitaph from one of Sill's officers stated that "No man in the entire army, I believe, was so much admired, respected, and beloved by inferiors as well as superiors in rank as was General Sill."

Fort Sill, Oklahoma
In 1869, Sill's West Point classmate and division commander, General Philip H. Sheridan, officially established a military post in the Wichita Mountains of Oklahoma. Sheridan named the military post in memory of Sill. Fort Sill is the largest field artillery complex in the world.

See also

List of American Civil War generals (Union)
List of Ohio's American Civil War generals

Notes
 Eicher, John H., and David J. Eicher. Civil War High Commands. Stanford, CA: Stanford University Press, 2001. .
 Warner, Ezra J. Generals in Blue: Lives of the Union Commanders. Baton Rouge: Louisiana State University Press, 1964. .

References

External links
A History of Fort Sill
Fort Sill – U.S. Army
Biography of Sill at Fort Sill (via Archive.org)

1831 births
1862 deaths
Union Army generals
People from Chillicothe, Ohio
People of Ohio in the American Civil War
United States Military Academy alumni
Burials at Grandview Cemetery (Chillicothe, Ohio)
Polytechnic Institute of New York University faculty
Union military personnel killed in the American Civil War